The 1919 Campeonato Gaúcho was the first season of Rio Grande do Sul's top association football league. Brasil de Pelotas won the title for the first time.

Format 

The championship was originally going to be contested by the four regional champions in a single round-robin system, with the team with the most points winning the title. The two teams that were able to compete played a single match in order to determine state champions.

Qualified teams

Originally, Nacional from São Leopoldo, Guarany from Bagé, 14 de Julho from Santana do Livramento, Uruguaiana from Uruguaiana and an unknown team from Cruz Alta would compete. However, these teams could not register their players in time.

Championship

Notes
A. Fonts differ about who scored Brasil de Pelota's goals. RSSSF Brasil cites two goals by Proença and three by Ignácio. Both Diário de Viamão and Futebol Nacional cites three goals by Proença at 11' or 12', 49' and 71' and a goal by Alvariza at 51', differing on the scorer of the second goal, where the former cites Farias at 18' and the latter cites Correa at 19'.

References 

Campeonato Gaúcho seasons
1919 in Brazilian football leagues